American singer, songwriter, actress, author, and comedian Bette Midler has received many awards and award nominations for her work on both the screen and stage.

Major awards

Academy Awards

BAFTA Awards

Drama Desk Awards

Golden Globe Awards

Grammy Awards

Primetime Emmy Awards

Satellite Awards

Tony Awards

Other awards 
References:

References 

Middler, Bette
Awards